The Warki are a lakalinyeri (tribe) of the Ngarrindjeri Australian Aboriginal people of southern Australia.

Language
The Warki spoke a dialect variety of Ngarrindjeri.

Country
The Warki traditionally inhabited the area around the north and western areas of Lake Alexandrina, from Grote Hill as far as Currency Creek. They were also present on the eastern and western extremities of Hindmarsh Island.

Social organization
The Warki were composed of at least 8 clans
 Korowalle

Alternative names
 Warkend
 Wakend
 Koraulun. (Jarildekald exonym for the Korowalle clan)
 Milang dialect

Notes

Citations

Sources

Aboriginal peoples of South Australia
Ngarrindjeri